This is a list of events in British radio during 1971.

Events

January
3 January – The Open University begins broadcasts on the BBC.

February
1 February – Radio-only and combined radio & television licences are abolished.

March to December
No events.

Station debuts
 26 January – BBC Radio Blackburn
 25 February – BBC Radio Humberside
 29 April – BBC Radio Derby

Programme debuts
 15 February – Lines from My Grandfather's Forehead, BBC Radio 4 (1971–1972)
 28 February (pilot), 5 December (series) – Parsley Sidings, BBC Radio 2 (1971–1973)
 You Don't Have to Be Jewish, BBC Radio London (1971–1995)

Continuing radio programmes

1940s
 Sunday Half Hour (1940–2018)
 Desert Island Discs (1942–Present)
 Down Your Way (1946–1992)
 Letter from America (1946–2004)
 Woman's Hour (1946–Present)
 A Book at Bedtime (1949–Present)

1950s
 The Archers (1950–Present)
 The Today Programme (1957–Present)
 The Navy Lark (1959–1977)
 Sing Something Simple (1959–2001)
 Your Hundred Best Tunes (1959–2007)

1960s
 Farming Today (1960–Present)
 In Touch (1961–Present)
 The Men from the Ministry (1962–1977)
 I'm Sorry, I'll Read That Again (1964–1973)
 Petticoat Line (1965–1979)
 The World at One (1965–Present)
 The Official Chart (1967–Present)
 Just a Minute (1967–Present)
 The Living World (1968–Present)
 The Organist Entertains (1969–2018)

1970s
 PM (1970–Present)
 Start the Week (1970–Present)
 Week Ending (1970–1998)
 You and Yours (1970–Present)

Births
5 January
Joanna Gosling, journalist and newsreader
Jayne Middlemiss, radio and television presenter
18 January – Leona Graham, broadcaster and voiceover artist
29 January – Clare Balding, BBC Sports presenter, journalist and jockey
10 May – Simon Jack, financial journalist
23 May – Claudia Hammond, radio presenter
27 May – Petroc Trelawny, classical music presenter
1 June – Nihal Arthanayake, broadcaster
17 August – Bridget Christie, stand-up comedian

Deaths
28 May – Ralph Wightman, writer and broadcaster on countryside matters (born 1901)
16 June – John Reith, 1st Baron Reith, Scottish broadcasting executive (born 1889)

See also 
 1971 in British music
 1971 in British television
 1971 in the United Kingdom
 List of British films of 1971

References

Radio
British Radio, 1971 In
Years in British radio